Héroux is a French surname. Notable people with the surname include:

Alain Héroux, professional hockey player
Denis Héroux, Quebec film director and producer
George Arthur Heroux was one of the people on the FBI's Ten Most Wanted List during the 1950s
George Heroux was the birth-name of baseball player George Wheeler (pitcher) 
Urbain Héroux, killer of John McLoughlin, Jr.
Yves Héroux, professional hockey player

See also
Héroux-Devtek, a company specializing in design and manufacture of industrial and aerospace products

French-language surnames